Ramsey County is a county in the U.S. state of North Dakota. As of the 2020 United States Census, the population was 11,605. Its county seat is Devils Lake.

History
The Dakota Territory legislature created the county on January 4, 1873, with areas partitioned from Pembina County. The county was named for Alexander Ramsey, a U.S. Senator from Minnesota. The county government was not completed at that time, and the county was not attached to another county for administrative or judicial purposes. This situation continued until January 25, 1883, when the county government was effected.

The county's boundaries were altered twice in March 1883, twice more in 1885, and in 1890. Its present boundaries have remained unchanged since 1890.

Geography
The southwest boundary of Ramsey County is defined by Devils Lake. The county terrain consists of rolling hills, dotted with lakes and ponds. The area is largely devoted to agriculture.

Major highways

  U.S. Highway 2
  U.S. Highway 281
  North Dakota Highway 1
  North Dakota Highway 17
  North Dakota Highway 19
  North Dakota Highway 20
  North Dakota Highway 57

Adjacent counties

 Cavalier County - north
 Walsh County - east
 Nelson County - southeast
 Benson County - southwest
 Towner County - northwest

National protected areas
 Lake Alice National Wildlife Refuge (part)
 Silver Lake National Wildlife Refuge (part)

Lakes

 Chain Lake
 Creel Bay
 Dry Lake
 East Devils Lake
 Lake Alice
 Lake Irvine
 Mikes Lake
 Morrison Lake
 Sixmile Bay
 Sweetwate Lake

Demographics

2000 census
As of the 2000 census, there were 12,066 people, 4,957 households, and 3,187 families in the county. The population density was 10.2/sqmi (3.92/km2). There were 5,729 housing units at an average density of 4.83/sqmi (1.86/km2). The racial makeup of the county was 92.31% White, 0.21% Black or African American, 5.40% Native American, 0.26% Asian, 0.02% Pacific Islander, 0.17% from other races, and 1.64% from two or more races. 0.52% of the population were Hispanic or Latino of any race. 37.7% were of German and 33.7% Norwegian ancestry.

There were 4,957 households, out of which 29.90% had children under the age of 18 living with them, 51.80% were married couples living together, 8.50% had a female householder with no husband present, and 35.70% were non-families. 31.10% of all households were made up of individuals, and 14.60% had someone living alone who was 65 years of age or older.  The average household size was 2.34 and the average family size was 2.94.

The county population contained 25.00% under the age of 18, 8.00% from 18 to 24, 25.90% from 25 to 44, 22.30% from 45 to 64, and 18.80% who were 65 years of age or older. The median age was 40 years. For every 100 females there were 97.40 males. For every 100 females age 18 and over, there were 94.40 males.

The median income for a household in the county was $35,600, and the median income for a family was $42,439. Males had a median income of $29,562 versus $18,629 for females. The per capita income for the county was $18,060. About 8.70% of families and 12.60% of the population were below the poverty line, including 16.90% of those under age 18 and 8.00% of those age 65 or over.

2010 census
As of the 2010 census, there were 11,451 people, 4,955 households, and 3,008 families in the county. The population density was 9.65/sqmi (3.72/km2). There were 5,615 housing units at an average density of 4.73/sqmi (1.83/km2). The racial makeup of the county was 87.7% white, 8.7% American Indian, 0.4% black or African American, 0.4% Asian, 0.2% from other races, and 2.6% from two or more races. Those of Hispanic or Latino origin made up 1.2% of the population. In terms of ancestry, 41.9% were German, 37.7% were Norwegian, 7.0% were Irish, 5.7% were Swedish, 5.2% were English, and 2.9% were American.

Of the 4,955 households, 27.5% had children under the age of 18 living with them, 47.0% were married couples living together, 9.5% had a female householder with no husband present, 39.3% were non-families, and 34.5% of all households were made up of individuals. The average household size was 2.21 and the average family size was 2.82. The median age was 43.0 years.

The median income for a household in the county was $41,792 and the median income for a family was $56,632. Males had a median income of $41,274 versus $25,171 for females. The per capita income for the county was $24,130. About 8.7% of families and 11.5% of the population were below the poverty line, including 16.7% of those under age 18 and 15.4% of those age 65 or over.

Communities
Cities

 Brocket
 Crary
 Devils Lake (county seat)
 Edmore
 Hampden
 Lawton
 Starkweather

Unincorporated communities

 Bartlett
 Churchs Ferry
 Darby
 Derrick
 Doyon
 Essex
 Garske
 Grand Harbor
 Keith
 Lakewood Park
 Penn
 Ramsey
 Rohrville
 Saint Joe
 Southam
 Sweetwater
 Webster

Townships

 Bartlett
 Cato
 Chain Lakes
 Coulee
 Creel
 De Groat
 Dry Lake
 Fancher
 Freshwater
 Grand Harbor
 Hammer
 Harding
 Highland Center
 Hope
 Klingstrup
 Lawton
 Lillehoff
 Minnewaukan
 Morris
 Newbre
 Newland
 Noonan
 North Creel
 Northfield
 Odessa
 Ontario
 Overland
 Pelican
 Poplar Grove
 Prospect
 Royal
 South Minnewaukan
 Stevens
 Sullivan
 Triumph
 Webster

Politics
Ramsey County voters have traditionally voted Republican. In only two national elections since 1944 has the county selected the Democratic Party candidate (as of 2020).

See also
 National Register of Historic Places listings in Ramsey County, North Dakota

References

External links
 Ramsey County official website
 Ramsey County maps, Sheet 1 (northern) and Sheet 2 (southern), North Dakota DOT''

 
1883 establishments in Dakota Territory
Populated places established in 1883